Westbury Park is a suburb of the city of Bristol, United Kingdom. It lies to the east of Durdham Down between the districts of Redland and Henleaze. The area is very similar in character to nearby Redland and comprises mainly Victorian and early twentieth-century architecture, along with a selection of Georgian buildings. Many of these buildings still have their original house names and many Victorian artifacts have been found in the gardens of Westbury Park.

The area was once part of the parish of Westbury-on-Trym, from which it takes its name.

Westbury Park Primary School lies in the southern side of the area and was established in 1893.

Major roads within Westbury Park include North View, Coldharbour Road, Linden Road and Redland Road.

Politics

Westbury Park is split between the Parliamentary constituencies of Bristol West and Bristol North West. The MPs for those constituencies are Thangam Debbonaire and Darren Jones respectively. Both are members of the Labour Party.

Westbury Park is split between the ward of Redland and the ward of Westbury-on-Trym & Henleaze. Redland is represented by Martin Fodor and Fi Hance, both members of the Green Party. Hance was a member of the Liberal Democrats before defecting to the Greens in 2015.  Westbury-on-Trym and Henleaze is represented by Geoff Gollop, Liz Radford and Steve Smith, all members of the Conservative Party.

Transport

Westbury Park is served by bus service 1, 2 and 3 operated by First West of England, which connect Bristol city centre with Cribbs Causeway by various routes. First also operates the U1, running between the city centre and Stoke Bishop and serving Westbury Park. It is also served by bus service 505, operated by Bristol Community Transport and links Long Ashton with Southmead Hospital.

Churches

Several churches lie within Westbury Park, including Westbury Park Church, St Alban's Church, Etloe Evangelical Church, Cairns Road Baptist Church and Westbury Park Spiritualist Church.

References

External links 

Areas of Bristol